Nepal is a surname used by Khas Brahmin people of Nepal. The origin of people with surname Nepal is Nepa village of Dullu. It is considered that the surname Naipal or Naipaul has been Anglicization of the surname Nepal.

Notable people with Nepal/Naipal/Naipaul surname

Madhav Kumar Nepal, 34th Prime Minister of Nepal
Kul Prasad Nepal, Nepalese politician
Jeetu Nepal, Nepalese actor and comedian
V. S. Naipaul, British Nobel Laureate of Indo-Nepalese origin 
Seepersad Naipaul, 
Shiva Naipaul

References

Further reading
Rajatpatra sabdalekh' by Malla kings, 'Nepabirta thamauti Rukka lalmohar' By Shree 5 Maharajdhiraj Rana Bahadur Shah on BS 1852 Bhadra 13 Preserved by Government of Nepal
Nepal Bansawali'Rajagaganiraj ko yatra' by Purnaprakash Nepal 2039BS, 'Karnali Pradesh ekbaato adhyaan' 2028 BS Editorial Bhimprasad/Devichandra Shrestha. 'seti anchal digdarshan'2035 BS, 'Nepal ko atihaashik ruprekha' Balachhandra sharma

External links
  Directory to Nepal clan.

Ethnic groups in Nepal
Bahun
Surnames of Nepalese origin
Nepali-language surnames
Khas surnames